Drago (stylised as DRAGO) is an independent international publishing house of contemporary art based in Rome, Italy. The company specialises in street and urban art and has published the works of street photographers, street artists and graffiti writers from around the world. It is frequently involved in exhibitions of contemporary art and acts as the official publisher for various galleries, museums and institutions.

Overview 
Drago was founded in 2001 by Paulo Lucas von Vacano as publisher, following years working as an Italian-German journalist and president of the Castelvecchi Publishing Company, Posse of Antonio Negri and Aspenia Magazine of The Aspen Institute. He was joined by Domitilla Sartogo as executive director and Nicola Veccia Scavalli as art director.

In the same year, the company published its first book, Brice Marden's Brice Marden: Opere Su Carta 1964-2001 which was followed by the publication of Ed Templeton's The Golden Age of Neglect in 2002. As well as selling out quickly, this title became the professional skateboarder's best-known book.

In 2002 Drago organized the Via Crucis by Andres Serrano, an exhibition, curated by Marianna Vecellio and Angela Dorazio in the converted church Santa Marta al Collegio Romano in Rome. 
In 2003 Drago took part to "Now Underground", an international exhibition curated by Cecilia Nesbit and for which Drago published its catalogue.
In 2005 DRAGO releases La Transavangardia Italiana, a book on the Italian Neo-expressionism by Achille Bonito Oliva, with artists Mimmo Paladino, Francesco Clemente, Sandro Chia, Enzo Cucchi, Nicola De Maria and directs and produces the exhibition Kennedy: The Family, Values and History at the Temple of Hadrian in Rome.
In 2007 Drago curates and organizes Jeremy Fish’s exhibition Rome-Antic Delusions with artworks especially created by the artist in Rome for the exhibition. Its homonymous catalogue soon became a cult object. 
In 2007 Drago published Muerte, the first book on Mike Giant. The book was one of Amazon’s best sellers for several seasons.
During the years Drago has published several best seller as Young Sleek and Full of Hell by Aaron Rose with interventions by artists such as Terry Richardson, Chloë Sevigny, Mark Gonzales, Carlo McCormick, Harmony Korine, Oliver Zaham, Ryan McGinley, Ari Marcopoulos, Rita Ackermann, Barry McGee, Phil Frost and Bruce Labruce. In 2007 Drago also published Heroes by Adrian Tranquilli, the catalog of the artist's exhibition at the Galleria Stefania Miscetti in Rome.

More recently, Drago's books have included Miss Van's Wild at Heart; Estevan Oriol's LA Woman and Boogie's Ah Wah do Dem, a book that received a score of 9.6/10 in a recent Street Hunters review. Among other notable books are Letizia Battaglia’s Anthology, which has been mentioned on CNN, BBC News, The Wall Street Journal and The Daily Beast., and the catalogue "Per Pura Passione", produced in a bilingual edition of the homonymous exhibition at MAXXI, National Museum of XXI Century Arts in Rome.

Drago has worked alongside many exhibitors of contemporary art. As the publisher of The French Academy in Rome – Villa Medici, it has been in charge of all publications for exhibitions and artists-in-residence and published many books with its director and art historian, Eric de Chassey. such as "Jean Auguste Dominique Ingres / Ellworth Kelly", the homonymous catalog of the exhibition whose works by Jean-Auguste-Dominique Ingres come from the Louvre museum and from the private collection of Ellsworth Kelly.
 
Amongst the publications for The French Academy in Rome – Villa Medici is the famous Europunk, The Visual Culture of Punk in Europe, 1976-1980, the first anthology of its kind documenting punk subculture. In 2011 Drago realized From Style Writing to Art – a Street Art Anthology with the French curator Magda Danysz.
In 2012 Drago published The Wrinkles of the City Shanghai
 and The Wrinkles of the City Los Angeles by the artist JR.
In 2013 Drago realized LA Portraits, the second project with the photographer Estevan Oriol.

Elsewhere, the company has collaborated with the Outdoor Festival in Rome to produce a five-year catalogue of their exhibitions and the Dorothy Circus Gallery in Rome to create a trilogy of books documenting over three years of exhibitions dedicated to the Lowbrow art movement and Hello Here I Am, the first anthology of the Japanese artist Kazuki Takamatsu.

Among other clients are Nike, The L'Orèal Group, Danesi, The City of Rome, 55DSL, Alcatel and Bulgari.

Drago's most recent project has been an exhibition at the Museum of Contemporary Art of Rome. Curated by Paulo Lucas von Vacano and Christian Omodeo, Cross the Streets recounts 40 years of street art and graffiti writing in Rome and beyond. It hosts 200 artworks from a number of artists ranging from Shepard Fairey to DAIM including some that came to the museum specifically to produce artwork for the exhibition.

In 2018 Drago gave birth to This Is Los Angeles by Estevan Oriol and Art From the Streets, the catalogue of French gallerist Magda Danysz’s homonymous exhibition.

During the 58th Art Biennale – 2019 – Venice, titled "May You Live in Interesting Times", DRAGO brings to life to the Bahrain Pavilion, with the exhibition "The Wait: Contemporary Artists from Bahrain". 
In 2019 Drago published Crash Kid, A Hip Hop Legacy 

In 2020 Crossroads, a Glimpse into the Life of Alice Pasquini, the first anthology of the worldwide renown Street Artist Alicè, who has been elected artist of the year by Rai Radio Tre. Drago also collaborates with the organization "Susan G. Komen Italia" for the creation of a mural, entrusted to Alice Pasquini, on the theme of breast cancer treatment and prevention, scheduled during the annual event "Komen: Race for the Cure".

In April, author Drago Estevan Oriol climbed Netflix's Top Ten in the United States with "LA Originals", a documentary created with Mister Cartoon on Chicano culture becoming a global artistic phenomenon.

In 2021 Drago publishes "B.A.D .: Beautiful and Determined", a book focused on the concept of beauty and self- acceptance. The book, result of decades of photographic research by the authors Erika Zanatta and Alessandra Tisato, is
a manifesto on the empowerment of women and non-binary people. In the same year, on the occasion of the launch of the Red Valentino Spring / Summer 2021 campaign, Drago created the monographic volume "Stazione Termini Lookbook 2009-2021"  with the author of the campaign directed by Pierpaolo Piccioli, Niccolò Berretta. For more than ten years Niccolò Berretta has photographed people in the largest train station in Rome. Following the media coverage, including the Financial Times, the volume was presented at LMDS, Le Monde de SHC in Shanghai and during the Pop Up Black Tag events in the concept stores in Rome and Milan.

"Neapolis" is the latest catalog published by Drago with the international photographer Boogie, a collector's photographic book on Naples with more than 80 black and white images and with the introduction of Luchè. 
"Street Life" is the first book by director and screenwriter Brad Mirman that explores the universe of Los Angeles from a unique and symbolic point of view. With more than one hundred black and white shots, photographer Brad Mirman shows us a West Coast never seen before, powerful and genuine, through timeless images that tell an emotion.
From 8 to 10 October Drago participated as creative director and communication agency of the 21st edition of the International Tattoo Expo in Rome.

In October 2021 Drago made Janette Beckman's monograph entitled "Rebels: From Punk to Dior". The book contains photos of the pioneers of the Hip hop movement such as Salt-N-Pepa, Run DMC, Grand Master Flash, Slick Rick e LL Cool J. In December Rebels was elected among the Books of the Year 2021 by the Rough Trade Center of New York. The Fotografiska Museum presented the volume as well as the Dior store in New York with the creation of a limited edition print. Among the media that have been involved in advertising appear The Guardian, Forbes, Fox5, VMagazine.

In the second semester of the 2021's academic year, Paulo von Vacano, publisher and CEO Drago, during the Fashion Studies degree course at Sapienza Università di Roma, held several "Luxury and High Fashion Brand Communication" lessons together with Professor Paolo Cenciarelli, bringing as case studies, various project experiences of his publishing house.

On December 8, 2021, Drago inaugurated, at the National Galleries of Ancient Art in Rome, the exhibition "Giuseppe Loy. A certain Italy. Photographs 1959-1981", curated by Chiara Agradi and Angelo Loy. The catalog contains the texts of Edoardo Albinati, writer, Chiara Agradi, art historian, Luca Massimo Barbero, director of the Institute of Art History of the Fondazione Giorgio Cini, Bruno Corà, president of the Fondazione Palazzo Albizzini Collezione Burri, Emilio Garroni, philosopher, Margherita Guccione, director of MAXXI Architettura, Angelo Loy, president of the Giuseppe Loy Photographic Archive, Rosetta Loy, writer, Alice Rohrwacher, director.

In April 2022 Drago created the "Jago" catalog for the first anthological exhibition of the eponymous sculptor at Palazzo Bonaparte (Rome). —pseudonym of Jacopo Cardillo, but universally known as "The Social Artist"—represents the emblem of the contemporary artist who blends talent, attention to the tradition and tragic elements, with themes viscerally linked to the spirit of our times and made accessible thank to his innate communicative ability, which has generated his great success on social media and mass media.

Drago has published 152 titles, of which 12 have sold out.

Paulo von Vacano 
Paulo Lucas von Vacano is an Italian-German publisher based in Rome who founded Drago in 2002. A former journalist, he contributed to several international magazines and newspapers. He then served as president of the Castelvecchi Publishing Company where he produced 500 books and several magazines, including Toni Negri's Posse and Aspenia Magazine (of The Aspen Institute).

As founder of Drago Publishing, he has curated several exhibitions, including "Cross The Streets" at the MACRO in 2017, which exhibited artists such as Shepard Fairey aka Obey the Giant, Estevan Oriol, Invader, Evol, Boogie, WK Interact, Lee Quinones, and Fab 5 Freddy.

Other exhibitions he has curated include "Angel of Decay" by Ed Templeton, "Via Crucis" by the artist Andrès Serrano "Kennedy: the family, values, history", the biggest European exhibition on the Kennedy family at the Temple of Hadrian (Rome).

Since 2014 Paulo Lucas von Vacano has been a share-holder of the Audaces Foundation, an international non-profit organization that provides educational platforms.

Domitilla Sartogo 
Domitilla Sartogo graduated with a BA in Fine Arts from the Cooper Union School of Art, New York. She has been the executive director of Drago since 2004. She previously worked as a graphic designer for the Richard Avedon Studio, as a talent scout and director of photography for Fabrica, the Benetton Group Center of Communications, as a professor of editorial design at the Parsons School of Design and as communications director for Borbonese, an Italian fashion brand where she also curated its fashion shows. She has acted as the executive director of the Florence Biennale of Fashion and Cinema, with seven exhibitions focusing on the relationship between film and fashion that brought together set, costume, and fashion designers from around the world.

Selected books 

2002: Ed Templeton The Golden Age of Neglect
2005: Aaron Rose Young, Sleek and Full of Hell
2006: Papik Rossi Mr. Rossi
2006: The Don, Microbo & Bo, Izastikup
2008: Alex Flach Berlin Calling
2008: Angelo Sindaco Skinstreet
2009: Nick Walker: A Sequence of Events
2009: Mike Giant Muerte
2009: Sten and Lex Stencil Poster
2009: Dalek His Majesty Fallacy
2009: JonOne JonOne Rock
2009: RJ Rushmore The Thousands 
2009: Mike Giant Coup D'Etat
2010: Estevan Oriol LA Woman
2010: Dorothy Circus Gallery City Slang
2010: Dorothy Circus Gallery Pop Surrealism
2011: Miss Van Twinkles
2011: Magda Danysz and Marie Noelle Dana: From Style Writing to Art
2011: Éric de Chassey Europunk: The Visual Culture of Punk in Europe
2011: JBROCK & Diamond Roma Omnia Vincit
2011: Ricardo Ghilardi Lo Sguardo Non Mente
2011: Brian Adam Douglas Paper Cuts
2011: CB Smith Phone Book
2012: Miss Van Wild at Heart
2012: JR The Wrinkles of the City: Shanghai
2012: JR The Wrinkles of the City: Los Angeles
2012: Chris Stain  Long Story Short
2013: Estevan Oriol LA Portraits
2013: Ricky Adams: Destroying Everything
2013: Dorthy Circus Gallery Once Upon a Time
2013: Dorthy Circus Gallery Walk on the Wild Side
2013: Magda Danysz Les Bains
2013: Micol Di Verol Israel Now
2013: Sean Scully Change & Horizontals
2014: DAIM Mirko Reisser [DAIM]: 1986-20142014: Angelo Sindaco Cooking with the Bears
2014: Massimo Sgroi Shepard Fairy #Obey
2014: WK WK Act 4
2014: Maureen Brodbeck Oeuvres Photographique
2014: Outdoor Roma Wasn't Built in a Day
2014: M. Cardelli, A. Nove Isabella Ferrari Forma-Luce
2015: Boogie: A Wah Do Dem
2015: Dorthy Circus Gallery The Doors of Perception
2015: Kazuki Takamatsu Hello Here I AM
2016: Letizia Battaglia Anthology
2016: Letizia Battaglia Per Pura Passione
2016: Stefan Canto: Concrete Archive
2016: WK WK-Gear
2016: Dolce Q: Rome Wasn't Drawn in a Day
2017: Paulo von Vacano The Street is Watching: Where Street Knowledge Meets Photography
2017: Paulo von Vacano Cross the Streets
2017: Marco Kayone Mantovani Vecchia Scuola: Graffiti Writing A Milano
2017: Keffer The Night Day: A Story About The Other Side
2017: AAVV: Decades: 5 Artists for 5 Decades of Pop Culture
2017: AAVV Io Sono Persona
2017: AAVV Jungle: L'Immaginario Animale nella Moda
2017: Claudia Pajewski The Hands of the City
2018: Magda Danysz Art From The Streets
2018: Estevan Oriol This is Los Angeles
2018: Faith XLVII Ex Animo'
2018: Felipe Pantone Dynamic Phenomena
2018: Futura 2000 Full Frame
2018: Claudio Zambianchi, Ilaria Schiaffini, Vittoria Caterina Caratozzolo Irene Brin, Gaspero del Corso e La Galleria L'Obelisco
2018: JonOne JonOne None Niente Può Fermarmi
2019: Paolo Cenciarelli Vangelo MMXVIII
2019: N. Shabout, E. Elgibreen After Illusion
2019: Napal & Ben Matundu, Crash Kids, A Hip Hop Legacy
2020: Alice Pasquini, Crossroads: A Glimpse into the Life of Alice Pasquini
2021: Erika Zanatta and Alessandra Tisato, B.A.D.:Beautiful And Determined
2021: Niccolò Beretta, Stazione Termini Lookbook 2009-2021
2021: Brad Mirman, Street Life
2021: Boogie, Neapolis
2021: Janette Beckman Rebels: From Punk To Dior
2021: Giuseppe Loy Una Certa Italia
2022: Jago Jago

Book series
2007: 36 Chambers. Inspired by the film The 36th Chamber of Shaolin, the series features 17 books from a diverse range of contemporary artists including Nick Walker, Mike Giant and Ivory Serra. For many of these artists, including Nick Walker, their contribution to the series was their first ever book.

Exhibitions

Drago exhibitions
2002: Andres Serrano: Via Crucis at Santa Marta al Collegio Romano, a deconsecrated church in Rome. Curated by Paulo von Vacano.
2003: Ed Templeton: Angel of Decay at Acquario Romano in Rome. Curated by Paulo von Vacano.
2005: Kennedy. La Famiglia, I Valori, Una Storia at the Temple of Hadrian in Rome. Commissioned by Walter Veltroni and organised by Drago, the exhibition remains the largest in Europe to document the Kennedy family. Catalogue .
2017: Cross the Streets; 40 Years of Street Art and Writing at the Museum of Contemporary Art of Rome. Curated by Paulo von Vacano, concept by Drago.
2017: The Street is Watching, at the International Centre of Photography, Palermo, Italy
2021: Giuseppe Loy. Una certa Italia. Fotografie 1959-1981, at the National Galleries of Ancient Art in Rome

Exhibition catalogues
2008: Scala Mercalli at Auditorium Parco della Musica in Rome. Curated by Gianluca Marziani. Catalogue .
2008: City Slang, The Street Comes to the Gallery at the Dorothy Circus Gallery in Rome. Catalogue 
2009: Dalek + Mike Giant at the Magda Danysz Gallery in Paris. Curated by Magda Danysz. Dalek catalogue , Mike Giant catalogue 
2010: I Mutanti at the French Academy in Rome. Curated by Eric de Chassey. Catalogue 
2010: Jean-Auguste Dominique Ingres / Ellsworth Kelly at the French Academy in Rome. Curated by Eric de Chassey. Catalogue 
2011: Europunk: The Visual Culture Of Punk In Europe at the French Academy in Rome. Curated by Eric de Chassey. English catalogue .
2011: Lo Sguardo Non Mente (English: The Eyes Never Lie) at Palazzo Cà Zanardi, Venice by Riccardo Ghilardi. Catalogue 
2012: Miss Van: Wild at Heart at the Dorothy Circus Gallery in Rome. Catalogue 
2012: Jean-Marc Bustamante at the French Academy in Rome. Curated by Eric de Chassey. Catalogue 
2013: Israel Now [Reinventing the Future] at the Museum of Contemporary Art of Rome. Curated by Micol Di Veroli. Catalogue .
2013: Les Bains : Résidence d’Artistes at les Bains Douches in Paris. Commissioned by Jeanne-Pierre Marois and curated by Magda Danysz. Catalogue 
2013: Sean Scully: Change and Horizontals at the Galleria Nazionale d'Arte Moderna in Rome. Curated by Joanna Kleinberg and Brett Littman, in collaboration with Peter Benson Miller. Catalogue .
2013-2014: Europunk – Cité de la Musique at Cité de la Musique, Paris. Curated by Eric de Chassey. Catalogue .
2014: Simon Hantai at the French Academy in Rome. Curated by Eric de Chassey. Catalogue 
2014: Shepard Fairey #OBEY at Palazzo delle Arti di Napoli in Naples. Curated by Massimo Sgroi. Catalogue .
2015: Kazuki Takamatsu, Even a Doll Can Do It at the Dorothy Circus Gallery in Rome. Catalogue .
2016-2017: Letizia Battaglia, Just For Passion (Italian: Per Pura Passione) at the MAXXI National Museum of the 21st Century Arts in Rome. Curated by Paolo Falcone, Margherita Guccione, and Bartolomeo Pietromarchi. English catalogue , Italian catalogue .
2017: Concept Paulo Lucas von Vacano, Cross the Streets at the MACRO Museum of Contemporary Art in Rome. Catalogue 
2017: Giovanna Calvenzi e Kitty Bolognesi, Io sono Persona .
2021: Giuseppe Loy Una Certa Italia
2022: Jago Jago

References

External links 
 Drago's website

Publishing companies established in 2001
Book publishing companies of Italy
Companies based in Rome
Italian companies established in 2001
Publishing companies of Italy